Chabrignac is a commune in the Corrèze department in central France.

Population

Personalities
Empress Nam Phương, wife of Bảo Đại, died and is buried in Chabrignac.

See also
Communes of the Corrèze department

References

Communes of Corrèze